Daniels Farm is a census-designated place (CDP) in the town of Trumbull, Fairfield County, Connecticut, United States. It is in the northeast part of Trumbull and is bordered to the northeast by the city of Shelton. The Connecticut Route 25 expressway forms the southwest edge of the CDP, and Route 111 (Monroe Turnpike) forms the short northwest edge. The CDP extends south as far as Hedgehog Road, Old Dike Road, and Pinewood Trail. To the south is the Trumbull Center CDP.

Daniels Farm was first listed as a CDP prior to the 2020 census.

References 

Census-designated places in Fairfield County, Connecticut
Census-designated places in Connecticut